Yürekli is a village in the Yüksekova District of Hakkâri Province in Turkey. The village had a population of 333 in 2021.

References 

Villages in Yüksekova District
Kurdish settlements in Hakkâri Province